An Inch of Gold for an Inch of Time is the 2005 release by American mathcore band The Number Twelve Looks Like You. It was their first release through Eyeball Records.

Content
This EP contains two re-recorded songs from their 2003 album Put On Your Rosy Red Glasses, which are "Don't Get Blood on My Prada Shoes" and "Jesus and Tori". It also contains two early versions of songs that would be included on their second full-length album Nuclear. Sad. Nuclear., which are "Like a Cat" and "Clarissa Explains Cuntainment". The final track on the EP is a cover of The Knack's hit signature song "My Sharona".

Track listing 
"Clarissa Explains Cuntainment" – 2:26
"Don't Get Blood on My Prada Shoes" – 1:25
"Like a Cat" – 3:24
"Jesus and Tori" – 3:25
"My Sharona" (The Knack cover) – 3:17

Personnel
The Number Twelve Looks Like You
Jesse Korman – vocals
Justin Pedrick – vocals
Alexis Pareja – guitar
Jamie Mcilroy – guitar
Michael Smagula – bass guitar
Christopher Conger – drums, other percussion

Production
Dan Coutant – engineer, mastering, mixer
The Number Twelve Looks Like You – producer

The Number Twelve Looks Like You albums
2005 EPs